Tetracha aptera is a species of tiger beetle that was described by Chaudoir in 1862, and can be found in Mato Grosso, Brazil.

References

Cicindelidae
Beetles described in 1862
Endemic fauna of Brazil
Beetles of South America